Calvin is an impact crater located in Calvin Township, Cass County in the U.S. state of Michigan. It was discovered in 1987 by Randall Milstein of the Michigan Geological Survey while examining data from about 100 test wells drilled in the area.

It is 5 miles (8.5 km) in diameter and the age is estimated to be 450 ± 10 million years (Ordovician). The crater is not exposed to the surface. It lies about 100 to 400 feet (30–120 m) below today's ground level.

References

External links
Exploration of the Calvin impact structure

Landforms of Cass County, Michigan 
Impact craters of the United States
Landforms of Michigan
Ordovician impact craters